FC Boskovice is a football club located in Boskovice, Czech Republic. The club has participated numerous times in the Czech Cup, reaching the third round in the 2008–09 edition.

References

External links
 Official website 

Football clubs in the Czech Republic
Association football clubs established in 1926